Pauline Turner is a Scottish actress, known for her role as Mary Graham on the BBC drama series  Martin Chuzzlewit (1994), Frances on the BBC period drama series Peaky Blinders (2017–2019) and as June Begbie in the 2017 film T2 Trainspotting.

Filmography

Film

Television

Theatre

Awards and nominations

References

External links
 

20th-century Scottish actresses
21st-century Scottish actresses
Living people
People educated at Dumbarton Academy
Scottish film actresses
Scottish stage actresses
Scottish television actresses
Year of birth missing (living people)